The 2012 Laurence Olivier Awards were held on 15 April 2012 at the Royal Opera House, London.

The 2012 awards were sponsored by MasterCard and was streamed live online for with first time on the Olivier Awards's official website with live BBC Radio 2 coverage from Ken Bruce. The show was presented by Michael Ball and Imelda Staunton for the second year in a row.

Guest presenters included Zach Braff, Tyne Daly, David Suchet, Laurie Metcalf, Hayley Atwell, Jack Davenport, Jim Carter, Lenny Henry, Ronan Keating, James McAvoy, Patrick Stewart, Elaine Paige, Barbara Windsor and Zoë Wanamaker.

Winners and nominees 
The nominations were announced on 15 March 2012 in 23 categories.

Productions with multiple nominations and awards
The following 17 productions, including two ballets and two operas, received multiple nominations:

 9: Matilda
 5: Ghost, The Ladykillers and One Man, Two Guvnors
 4: Anna Christie, London Road, Shrek and Singin' in the Rain
 3: Betty Blue Eyes, Crazy for You, Frankenstein and South Pacific
 2: Anna Nicole, Castor and Pollux, Collaborators, Flare Path, Noises Off, Some Like It Hip Hop and The Metamorphosis

The following four productions received multiple awards:

 7: Matilda
 2: Anna Christie, Crazy for You and Frankenstein

See also
 66th Tony Awards
 12th Helpmann Awards

References

External links
 Previous Olivier Winners – 2012
 Coverage in the Daily Telegraph

Laurence Olivier Awards ceremonies
Laurence Olivier
Laurence Olivier Awards
Laurence Olivier Awards
Laurence Olivier Awards
Royal Opera House